Vexillum buriasense is a species of small sea snail, marine gastropod mollusk in the family Costellariidae, the ribbed miters.

Description
The length of the shell attains 23 mm.

Distribution
This marine species occurs off the Philippines, Papua New Guinea and Australia

References

 Lea, H. C. 1841. Descriptions of some new species of fossil shells from the Eocene at Claiborne, Alabama. American Journal of Science and Arts, series 1, 40(9):92-103, 1 pl

External links
 Tomlin, J. R. le B. (1920). On certain of Link's names in the Mitridae. The Nautilus. 33(4): 133-134

buriasense
Gastropods described in 1920